William Folsom Moore (October 28, 1868 – November 3, 1956) was a justice of the Supreme Court of Texas from April 1940 to January 1941.

References

Justices of the Texas Supreme Court
1868 births
1956 deaths